is a railway station in the town of Agui, Chita District,  Aichi Prefecture,  Japan, operated by Meitetsu.

Lines

Station layout
The station has two island platforms connected by a footbridge. The station is staffed.

Platforms

Adjacent stations

Station history
Agui Station was opened on July 21, 1983, replacing neighboring , which was located in an inconvenient location from the town center and which was closed. In July 2006, the Tranpass system of magnetic fare cards with automatic turnstiles was implemented.

Passenger statistics
In fiscal 2017, the station was used by an average of 3207 passengers daily (boarding passengers only).

Surrounding area
Agui town hall
Agui High School School
Agui Junior High School

See also
 List of Railway Stations in Japan

References

External links

 Official web page 

Railway stations in Japan opened in 1983
Railway stations in Aichi Prefecture
Stations of Nagoya Railroad
Agui, Aichi